Lee Wang-pyo (June 11, 1954 – September 4, 2018), better known by stage name Super Dragon, was a South Korean professional wrestler and martial artist.

In professional wrestling, Lee was the promoter of the top national promotion, World Wrestling Association; during the 1980s and the 1990s he has been the babyface and the ace of that promotion, which was called at the time Korean Wrestling Association, a position he held until his retirement in 2015.

Lee was one of the most famous professional wrestler in Korean wrestling history. He was praised by Lou Thesz for his wrestling skills.

Lee created the martial art known as gyeokgido.

Biography
He was born in 1954 in a small village in South Chungcheong province in South Korea, the second of four children.

He was notable for his tall stature since young age.

In elementary school, he was stabbed by an upperclassman. When interviewed about this fact, Lee claimed "The upperclassman couldn’t beat me by force, so he used cowardly means to win".

He said in an interview that it was in third grade that he decided to practice professional wrestling, inspired by a match involving his future master Kim II that he saw on television.

In 1975 he began training in professional wrestling in a wrestling gym run by Kim Il: Kim Il notice Lee’s talent and started to personally train the young wrestler.

Career in professional wrestling
In 1975 he debuted in the Korean Wrestling Association (KWA), which was founded in 1961 by his master Kim II: Lee is now considered his master's successor as the top face of the promotion and his top student. The promotion was and still is the top professional wrestling promotion in Korea.

During his career he has wrestled mainly in Korea and Japan: particularly, in 1978 Lee wrestled at the Japan-Korea Triple Competitions, a series of professional wrestling shows jointly organised by the Japanese International Wrestling Enterprise and by the KWA. He had also wrestled for All Japan Pro Wrestling.

In 1982, he wrestled under the name Jaguar Lee in New Japan Pro-Wrestling.

In 1985 he became the promoter of KWA, also known as Korean Pro-Wrestling Association (KPWA).

In 1990, he returned to Japan for Frontier Martial-Arts Wrestling.

In 1993 he won in the KPWA the GWF World Heavyweight Championship and on December 13, 1999 he lost with No Ji Sim to Jason The Terrible and One Man Gang in a match for the GWF World Tag Championship.

In 1995, he wrestled for Tokyo Pro Wrestling under the name Lee Hi.

In 2000 he changes KPWA name to World Wrestling Association: he claimed ties to the original World Wrestling Association.

Therefore he proceeded to win the revamped version of the WWA World Heavyweight Championship in 2000 defeating Kurrgan.

The KWA/KWPA was affiliated with National Wrestling Alliance till 1983; with Wang Pyo as the promoter, the "new" WWA rejoined NWA using NWA Korea as an alternative name for the promotion, but still retaining the WWA name.

On the January 23, 2003 he, along with Kim II, attended the WWE Raw show in Seoul.

On March 21, 2003 in Seoul he defeated Honky Tonk Man in a match for the WWA World Heavyweight Championship, before 1,500 fans: the match was part of a feud they were having that year.

In 2008 he defeated cleanly Kurt Angle in a WWA show in Korea.

On November 12, 2008 he defeated Bob Sapp in a match for the WWA World Heavyweight Championship, which was booked as a MMA style one, with an armbar submission. The match took place at a Forever Hero event at the Olympic Park stadium in Seoul.

On October 26, 2009, at his second reign, he lost his title in a rematch to Bob Sapp at the Olympic Stadium in Seoul.

In 2015, he retired after 40 years in the business.

Career in martial arts 
He studied different martial art sports, including taekwondo, judo and hapkido.

Lee created a legitimate martial art based on his repertoire of wrestling moves, called gyeokgido.

He was a member and a Grand Master Of Korean Military Arts of Korean Martial Arts Instructors Association.

Death 
On September 4, 2018, Lee died after a five-year battle with gallbladder cancer. He was 64 years old.

Filmography 
He was well known in South Korea and he  has appeared in various media.

Strike Love - Korean television drama (2009)

Championships and accomplishments
Korean Pro-Wrestling Association/World Wrestling Association (South Korea)/NWA Korea
WWA World Heavyweight Championship (3 times, first and final champion)
GWF World Heavyweight Championship (1 time, final champion)
Far East Heavyweight Championship (1 time)
NWA Oriental Heavyweight Championship (1 time)
NWA Oriental Tag Team Championship (2 time) – with Kim Kwang Sik and Kim Do Yu

In MMA

Championships and accomplishments
Korean Martial Arts Instructors Association
Grand Master Of Korean Military Arts
1-time Korean Mixed Martial Arts Champion

References

External links
information about KWA, WWA and Lee
official Lee's page on the WWA website

1954 births
2018 deaths
People from Cheonan
South Korean male professional wrestlers
Professional wrestling promoters
South Korean hapkido practitioners
South Korean male judoka
South Korean male taekwondo practitioners
South Korean wrestlers
Deaths from cancer in South Korea
Deaths from gallbladder cancer
20th-century professional wrestlers
21st-century professional wrestlers